Dominic Chapman (born ) is an English former rugby union footballer who played as a back three player. He won his only England cap against Australia during the 1998 "Tour of Hell". He played for a rugby club team in Richmond, London.

References 

Living people
English rugby union players
1976 births
England international rugby union players
Richmond F.C. players